In molecular biology mir-605 microRNA is a short RNA molecule. MicroRNAs function to regulate the expression levels of other genes by several mechanisms.

p53 protein network
miR-605 is transcriptionally activated by the p53 protein through interaction with the promoter region of its gene. This microRNA in turn post-transcriptionally represses the oncoprotein and p53 suppressor Mdm2, which acts with p53 in a negative feedback loop in p53-wildtype cancers. Introduction of miR-605 interrupts this p53:Mdm2 interaction and instead there is a positive feedback loop in place, enabling rapid p53 accumulation in response to stress. Such p53 accumulation induces cell cycle arrest and apoptosis.

See also 
 MicroRNA

References

Further reading

External links
 

MicroRNA
MicroRNA precursor families